Jaclyn Stelmaszyk ( Halko, born December 16, 1986) is a world champion Polish Canadian rower. She won gold in the lightweight women's quad sculls at the 2012 World Rowing Championships as a competitor for Poland. Stelmaszyk returned to the Canadian team and is the reigning Pan American Games Champion, winning gold in the lightweight women's double sculls with Kate Haber at the 2019 Pan Am Games in Lima. In December 2019 Jaclyn was granted an exemption to the three year rule by the Olympic executive board to change nationalities from Canada to Poland. She immediately began training with the Polish Rowing Federation (PZTW) in hopes of qualifying a lightweight double boat for the 2020 Tokyo Olympic games.

References 

1986 births
Living people
Canadian female rowers
Pan American Games gold medalists for Canada
Rowers at the 2019 Pan American Games
Rowers from Toronto
Pan American Games medalists in rowing
World Rowing Championships medalists for Poland
Medalists at the 2019 Pan American Games